Charlie Moore (born March 14, 1998) is a professional Canadian football linebacker for the Calgary Stampeders of the Canadian Football League (CFL).

University career
After using a redshirt season in 2016, Moore played U Sports football for the Calgary Dinos from 2017 to 2019. He played in 17 regular season games where he had 77 tackles, three forced fumbles, one fumble recovery, one sack, and one interception. In 2019, he finished as a Vanier Cup champion following the team's victory over the Montreal Carabins in the 2019 championship game. He did not play in 2020 due to the cancellation of the 2020 U Sports football season but remained eligible for the 2021 CFL Draft.

Professional career
Moore was drafted in the third round, 26th overall, by the Calgary Stampeders in the 2021 CFL Draft and signed with the team on May 18, 2021. He made the team's active roster following training camp and made his professional debut on August 7, 2021, against the Toronto Argonauts, where he had one punt block and one fumble recovery. He played in all 14 regular season games in 2021 where he had nine special teams tackles. Moore also played in the team's West Semi-Final loss to the Saskatchewan Roughriders.

In 2022, Moore again made the team's opening day roster and played predominantly on special teams.

References

External links
 Calgary Stampeders bio

1998 births
Living people
Calgary Stampeders players
Canadian football linebackers
Calgary Dinos football players
Players of Canadian football from British Columbia
People from Delta, British Columbia